Immacolata "Imma" Sirressi (born 19 May 1990 in Santeramo in Colle) is an Italian female volleyball player.

Career
She was part of the Italy women's national volleyball team. On club level she played for Duck Farm Chieri Torino in 2009. She was selected to play the Italian League All-Star game in 2017.

References

External links
 Immacolata Sirressi at the International Volleyball Federation
 

1990 births
Living people
Italian women's volleyball players
Place of birth missing (living people)
Sportspeople from the Metropolitan City of Bari
Liberos